In enzymology, a ribitol 2-dehydrogenase is an enzyme that catalyzes the chemical reaction

ribitol + NAD+  D-ribulose + NADH + H+

Thus, the two substrates of this enzyme are ribitol and NAD+, whereas its 3 products are D-ribulose, NADH, and H+.

This enzyme participates in pentose and glucuronate interconversions.

Nomenclature 

This enzyme belongs to the family of oxidoreductases, specifically those acting on the CH-OH group of donor with NAD+ or NADP+ as acceptor. The systematic name of this enzyme class is ribitol:NAD+ 2-oxidoreductase. Other names in common use include adonitol dehydrogenase, ribitol dehydrogenase A (wild type), ribitol dehydrogenase B (mutant enzyme with different properties), and ribitol dehydrogenase D (mutant enzyme with different properties).

References 

 
 
 

EC 1.1.1
NADH-dependent enzymes
Enzymes of unknown structure